Tobin Creek is a stream in Scotland County in the U.S. state of Missouri.

Tobin Creek has the name of George Tobin, a pioneer citizen.

See also
List of rivers of Missouri

References

Rivers of Scotland County, Missouri
Rivers of Missouri